Gusti Ayu Istri Biang Agung was queen of Mengwi, a principality in East Bali, from 1836–1857. 

She was the widow of Gusti Agung Ngurah Made Agung Putra.

References

Monarchs of Bali
19th-century women rulers
19th-century Indonesian women